Bryoria is a genus of lichenized fungi in the family Parmeliaceae. Many members of this genus are known as horsehair lichens. The genus has a widespread distribution, especially in boreal and cool temperate areas.

Taxonomy
Bryoria was circumscribed in 1977 by lichenologists Irwin Brodo and David Hawksworth, with Bryoria trichodes as the type species.

Description
Bryoria species are fruticose, slender and hair-like, tending to grow hanging (pendent) or like a small bush. They range in colour from dark brown to pale greyish brown to grey in some species. Ascospores are colourless, ellipsoid, numbering eight per ascus.

Other hair-like lichens that may be confused with Bryoria include dark brown species of Bryocaulon, Nodobryoria, Pseudephebe, Alectoria, or Cetraria.

Habitat and distribution
Found almost exclusively on conifers, or on tundra soil, Bryoria collectively has a widespread distribution, especially in boreal and cool temperate areas.

Species

Bryoria alaskana Goward & Myllys (2016)
Bryoria araucana Boluda, D.Hawksw. & V.J.Rico (2015) – Chile
Bryoria barbata Li S.Wang & D.Liu (2017) – China
Bryoria bicolor (Hoffm.) Brodo & D.Hawksw. (1977) – Electric horsehair lichen 
Bryoria capillaris (Ach.) Brodo & D.Hawksw. (1977)
Bryoria carlottae  – Languid horsehair lichen
Bryoria cervinula  – Mottled horsehair lichen
Bryoria chalybeiformis (L.) Brodo & D.Hawksw. (1977)
Bryoria fastigiata Li S.Wang & H.Harada (2006)
Bryoria forsteri Olech & Bystrek (2004) – Antarctica
Bryoria fremontii (Tuck.) Brodo & D.Hawksw. (1977) – Edible horsehair lichen
Bryoria friabilis  – Friable horsehair lichen
Bryoria fruticulosa Li S.Wang & Myllys (2017) – China
Bryoria furcellata (Fr.) Brodo & D.Hawksw. (1977) – Burred horsehair lichen
Bryoria fuscescens (Gyeln.) Brodo & D.Hawksw. (1977) – Pale-footed horsehair lichen
Bryoria glabra  – Shiny horsehair lichen
Bryoria hengduanensis Li S.Wang & H.Harada (2003) – China
Bryoria implexa (Hoffm.) Brodo & D.Hawksw. (1977)
Bryoria inactiva Goward, Velmala & Myllys (2013)
Bryoria irwinii Goward & Myllys (2016)
Bryoria kockiana Velmala, Myllys & Goward (2013) – Kock's horsehair lichen
Bryoria lanestris (Ach.) Brodo & D.Hawksw. (1977)
Bryoria nadvornikiana (Gyeln.) Brodo & D.Hawksw. (1977) – Blonde horsehair lichen
Bryoria nitidula (Th. Fr.) Brodo & D.Hawksw. (1977) – Tundra horsehair lichen
Bryoria pikei  – Streaked horsehair lichen
Bryoria pseudofuscescens (Gyeln.) Brodo & D.Hawksw. (1977) – Mountain horsehair lichen
Bryoria rigida P.M.Jørg. & Myllys (2012) – Asia
Bryoria salazinica  – Salazinic acid horsehair lichen
Bryoria simplicior  – Spangled horsehair lichen
Bryoria smithii (Du Rietz) Brodo & D.Hawksw. (1977)
Bryoria subcana (Nyl. ex Stizenb.) Brodo & D.Hawksw. (1977)
Bryoria tenuis (E.Dahl) Brodo & D.Hawksw. (1977) – Pied horsehair lichen) 
Bryoria trichodes (Michx.) Brodo & D.Hawksw. (1977) – Inelegant horsehair lichen
Bryoria vrangiana (Gyeln.) Brodo & D.Hawksw. (1977)
Bryoria wui Li S.Wang (2017) – China
Bryoria yunnanensis Li S.Wang & Xin Y.Wang (2017) – China

See also
List of Parmeliaceae genera

References

Lichen genera
Lecanorales genera
Taxa described in 1977
Taxa named by David Leslie Hawksworth
Taxa named by Irwin Brodo